Brzezinki  is a village in the administrative district of Gmina Wołczyn, within Kluczbork County, Opole Voivodeship, in southern Poland.

The village has a population of 450.

References

Brzezinki